Fiji competed in the Summer Olympic Games for the first time at the 1956 Summer Olympics in Melbourne, Australia.

Athletics

Boxing

Sailing

References
Official Olympic Reports

Nations at the 1956 Summer Olympics
1956
1956 in Fijian sport